Fritz Brandstätter (29 November 1891 – 7 October 1926) was an Austrian footballer. He played in one match for the Austria national football team in 1912.

References

External links
 
 

1891 births
1926 deaths
Austrian footballers
Austria international footballers
Place of birth missing
Association football defenders
SK Rapid Wien players